The Rise of Apocalypse is a four-issue limited series published in 1996 by Marvel Comics.  The series was written by Terry Kavanagh, and drawn by Adam Pollina.

Plot summary
5,000 years ago, a baby is found in the Egyptian desert by a band of nomad raiders. The child is raised and named En Sabah Nur by the tribe's leader, Baal, who teaches the boy survival of the fittest. During the same time, Egypt is ruled by the Pharaoh Rama-Tut who, in actuality, is the time traveller Kang the Conqueror, who arrived from the future to claim En Sabah Nur as his heir, because the boy will grow up to become one of the most powerful mutants and notorious villains in history; Apocalypse. Nur's tribe is destroyed by Tut's armies. Before Baal dies as well, he tells Nur that he is destined for greater things. Seeking revenge, En Sabah Nur travels to Rama-Tut's city where he hides himself as a slave and falls in love with Nephri, the sister of Ozymandias, Tut's general. But Nur is eventually rejected by Nephri, upon seeing his disfigured visage. His mutant powers awakening, he enslaves Ozymandias while Rama-Tut flees. Having renamed himself Apocalypse, he now sets out to destroy the weak.

Collected editions
The series has been collected into a trade paperback:

The Rise of Apocalypse (collects Rise of Apocalypse and X-Factor #5-6, 160 pages, March 1998)

Notes

References

Comics set in ancient Egypt
Comics about revenge
Comics about time travel
Eugenics in fiction